Abdul Quader Sikder is a politician of Narail District of Bangladesh and former member of Parliament for Narail-2 constituency in February 1996. (He is also known A Kader Sikder.)

Political life 
Sikder is the general secretary of Narail district BNP. He was elected to parliament from Narail-2 as a Bangladesh Nationalist Party candidate in 15 February 1996 Bangladeshi general election. He lost the June 1996 elections by participating in the BNP's nomination.

References 

Living people
Year of birth missing (living people)
People from Narail District
Bangladesh Nationalist Party politicians
6th Jatiya Sangsad members